The Ministry of Labour, Employment, Veteran and Social Policy of the Republic of Serbia is the ministry in the Government of Serbia. The current minister is Nikola Selaković, in office since 26 October 2022.

History
The Ministry was established on 11 February 1991. From 2001 to 2004, the Ministry was split in two separate ministries, one in charge of labour and employment with Dragan Milovanović as minister responsible and the other in charge of social policy with Gordana Matković as minister responsible.

Subordinate institutions
There are several agencies and institutions that operate within the scope of the Ministry:
 Labor Inspectorate
 Directorate for Safety and Health at Work
 The Republican Pension and Disability Insurance Fund
 National Employment Service
 Social Insurance Institute
 Republic Agency for the peaceful resolution of labor disputes
 Solidarity Fund
 Socio-Economic Council of the Republic of Serbia
 Institutions of Social Protection

List of ministers
Political Party:

References

External links
 
 Serbian ministries, etc – Rulers.org

Labour, Employment And Social Policy
1991 establishments in Serbia
Ministries established in 1991
Serbia